The island nation of Jamaica lies in the Caribbean Sea, south of Cuba and west of Hispaniola. It frequently experiences the effects of Atlantic tropical cyclones that track across the Caribbean, with impacting storms often originating east of the Windward Islands or in the southern Caribbean between Nicaragua and Colombia. There are two climatologically favored periods during the year for Jamaica hurricane activity, with the first lasting from August to mid-September and the second occurring during the latter half of October.

Observation
The earliest records of Jamaican hurricanes were derived from British observations during the colonial era, including those curated by British meteorologist William Reid and historians Bryan Edwards and Edward Long. In 2003, weather historical Michael Chenoweth developed a reconstruction of Jamaica's climate in the 18th century based on daily records kept by slaveowner Thomas Thistlewood, finding 12 tropical cyclone that produced gale-force or stronger sustained winds between 1750 and 1786 in Savanna-la-Mar. Thistlewood's observations were one of the first continuous weather records outside of Europe and the United States. Wind directions were also documented, with westerlies indicative of nearby tropical disturbances during the summer rainy season. Formal monitoring of hurricanes in Jamaica began with the formation of the Jamaican Weather Service in Kingston in 1880. Between its formation and 1896, the agency observed 38 tropical depressions and issued hurricane warnings three times. Tropical cyclones were of great importance to colonial interests due to their effects on crops and the slave trade.

Climatology

Tropical cyclones have impacted Jamaica throughout the Atlantic hurricane season between June and November, reflecting a timeframe most conducive to storm development in the Caribbean Sea and Jamaica's rainy season. During the spring, the Azores High shifts north, causing a decrease in wind shear and the strength of trade winds in the Caribbean and resulting in conditions favorable for convection. In summer, tropical waves are steered westward into the Caribbean by the high-pressure area; these are the primary cause of rainfall and Jamaica and may develop further into hurricanes before reaching the island. Climatologically, there are two peaks in Jamaican hurricane activity in August–September and the latter half of October. Hurricane activity near Jamaica is generally minimal until late July. Based on observations between 1886 and 1996, there is a 48 percent chance that at least one hurricane will threaten Jamaica and a 16 percent change that two or more will threaten the country, with a hurricane threat defined as a storm's center passing within  of Jamaica. Tropical waves and tropical cyclones account for 46 percent of destructive floods in Jamaica.

Jamaica's hurricanes typically have tropical origins rather than baroclinic ones; only the 1912 hurricane was of baroclinic nature. All landfalling hurricanes developed south of 15°N, and those that form east of the Windward Islands tend to continue west into the Yucatan Peninsula. On average, the southern coast is the most vulnerable to storm impacts. Most hurricanes impacting Jamaica take a southeast to northwest path, and those that do often approach from south of the island. During the second activity peak in October, storms impacting Jamaica tend to originate from the southern or southwestern Caribbean and are often associated with the monsoon trough rather than tropical waves. These storms develop between Nicaragua and Colombia and track north towards Jamaica.

Hurricane activity tends to be reduced during El Niño events when the eastern Pacific Ocean off the coasts of Peru and Ecuador is abnormally warm, due to an increase in vertical wind shear which is disruptive to hurricanes. This is correlated with a drier and warmer wet season in the Caribbean. Jamaica saw an elevated number of hurricane impacts in the 18th century and early 19th century. There has been an increase in hurricane intensity, frequency, and duration in the Atlantic since the early 1980s. The primary cause remains unknown, with the El Niño-Southern Oscillation (ENSO) and climate change discussed as possible but not definitive causes. Based on a report by the Intergovernmental Panel on Climate Change in 2012, the effects of climate change on storm tracks and frequency are uncertain or marginal, while wind and rainfall intensities are expected to increase.

Statistics

List of storms

Pre-1900

August 28, 1712 – Many homes and plantations were destroyed by a passing hurricane.
August 28, 1722 – The eye of an intense hurricane crossed Port Royal, bringing a  storm surge and causing extensive damage throughout the island. Half of the port's buildings were destroyed, with those built during English rule suffering worse than those built under Spanish rule. Roughly 400 people were killed, and only 4 crew among the 50 ships moored at Port Royal survived. The sinking of the slave ship Kingston alone claimed the lives of two hundred people. Surviving colonists were stricken without basic necessities. The storm's passage was documented in John Atkins' A Voyage to Guinea, Brasil, and the West-Indies (1723).
October 22, 1726 – A hurricane impacted the eastern part of Jamaica, damaging or sinking 50 ships and toppling several homes in Kingston, Port Royal, and Spanish Town.
October 20, 1744 – Wharves in Old Harbour, Passage Fort, and Port Royal were destroyed by a hurricane. In harbours, 104 ships capsized. A newly-established fort at Mosquito Point was also destroyed. An epidemic followed the storm, claiming additional lives.
October 3, 1780 – A hurricane's high storm surge destroyed Savanna-la-Mar and heavily impacted the southern coast of Jamaica, particularly southwestern portions.
 October 12–14, 1812 – A large cyclone affected much of the island. Houses were destroyed in Kingston and Savanna-la-Mar.
August 1, 1813 – A storm disrupted shipping and damaged buildings in Kingston.
August 28, 1813 – Vessels were wrecked by a storm in Savanna-la-Mar.
 October 18–19, 1815 – Heavy rains attending a storm caused flooding in eastern Jamaica. Homes were destroyed in St. George and St. James.
November 2, 1874 – A  made landfall on Clarendon with winds of 170 km/h (105 mph), causing £75,000 in damage and killing five people. Kingston, St. Ann, and St. Mary suffered the worst impacts. Crops were destroyed throughout the country and entire villages were washed away.
 October 11–13, 1879 – A passing tropical storm causes torrential downpours, dropping  of rain in Kingston where 13 fatalities occurred. The deluge swept away bridges, homes, and roads. Coffee and pimento plantations were also badly damaged.
August 19, 1880 – Kingston was hit by a hurricane, damaging crops and shipping in the city. Up-Park Camp incurred US$50,000 in losses after the military barracks were destroyed. Thirty people were killed in the accompanying floods throughout Jamaica. In Yallahs, 59 homes were destroyed and 3 people were killed. Though listed officially in the Atlantic hurricane database as a minor hurricane, a 2014 analysis by Michael Chenoweth suggested it may have been a major hurricane. Initial reports suggested two tropical cyclones were involved.
October 8, 1884 – The eastern half of Jamaica is struck by an intensifying tropical storm, producing heavy rainfall over Jamaica. In St. Thomas,  of rain caused damage to roads and property, as well as "some loss of life". Runoff from the Blue Mountains caused additional flooding in Morant Bay.
June 27, 1886 – At least 18 people were killed by a tropical storm that may have skirted the northern coast of Jamaica, primarily affecting the eastern half of the island. An  surge affected the eastern end of the island, washing away wharves in Boston. Fifteen drowned in Port Royal after their ship was overtaken by the waves.
 August 19–20, 1886 – The center of a  crossed Jamaica from the southeast to Montego Bay. At the Morant Point Lighthouse, the shore recessed . In Elmwood,  of rain was recorded.
October 27, 1899 –
November 8, 1899 –

1900–1919
August 11, 1903
June 13, 1904
 November 10–18, 1912
 August 12–13, 1915
 September 24–25, 1915
 August 15–16, 1916
September 23, 1917

1920–1939
November 8, 1932 – 1932 Cuba hurricane
October 29, 1933
October 21, 1935

1940–1969
August 20, 1944 – A Category 3 hurricane cut across Jamaica from Boston Bay to Montego Bay, causing widespread destruction along the northern half of the island. Winds of approximately  strike Annotto Bay. An estimated 90 percent of banana trees and 41 percent of coconut trees were lost, with an estimated damage toll in the millions of dollars. At least 30 fatalities were associated with the storm.
 October 15–16, 1950
 August 17–18, 1951 – Hurricane Charlie
October 5, 1954
 September 26–27, 1955
September 1958
 October 5–7, 1963
August 25, 1964
September 12, 1967

1970–1999
October 19, 1973
August 31, 1974 – Hurricane Carmen
September 2, 1978
June 12, 1979
August 6, 1980 – Hurricane Allen
September 12, 1988 – Hurricane Gilbert
November 13, 1994 — Hurricane Gordon (1994)

2000–2021

October 7, 2001 – Hurricane Iris
August 11, 2004 – Hurricane Charley
September 11, 2004 – Hurricane Ivan
July 7, 2005 – Hurricane Dennis
 October 17–18, 2005 – Hurricane Wilma
August 19, 2007 – Hurricane Dean
August 28, 2008 – Hurricane Gustav
November 8, 2008 – Hurricane Paloma
October 24, 2012 – Hurricane Sandy
October 3, 2016 – Hurricane Matthew
July 4, 2021 – Hurricane Elsa

See also

Hurricanes in the Bahama Archipelago
List of Cayman Islands hurricanes
List of Hispaniola hurricanes
List of Cuba hurricanes

References
Sources

 

Citations

Jamaica
Geography of Jamaica